Çatalelma can refer to:

 Çatalelma, Çankırı
 Çatalelma, Şenkaya